Skip Drinkwater is an American record producer. He is best known for working with jazz artists, Norman Connors, Alphonse Mouzon and Eddie Henderson, as well as discovering the Catalyst and working with the all black heavy metal band Sound Barrier.

Production Discography
Catalyst - Catalyst 1972
Neptune - The Visitors 1972
Dance Of Magic - Norman Connors 1972
Realization - Eddie Henderson 1973
Dark Of Light - Norman Connors 1973
First Time Out - James Montgomery Band 1973
Monkey In A Silk Suit Is Still A Monkey - Duke Williams And The Extremes 1973
Inside Out - Eddie Henderson 1974
Love From The Sun - Norman Connors 1974
Slewfoot - Norman Connors 1974
Sunburst - Eddie Henderson 1975
Saturday Night Special - Norman Connors 1975
Mind Transplant - Alphonse Mouzon 1975
Level One - The Eleventh House featuring Larry Coryell 1975
Mango Surprise - John Lee & Gerry Brown 1975
Heritage - Eddie Henderson 1976
Yesterday's Dreams - Alphonso Johnson 1976
You Are My Starship - Norman Connors 1976
The Man Incognito - Alphonse Mouzon 1976
A Tear And A Smile - Catalyst 1976
Anticipation - Willie Tee 1976
First Course - Lee Ritenour 1976
Still Can't Say Enough - John Lee & Gerry Brown 1976
Comin' Through - Eddie Henderson 1977
Romantic Journey - Norman Connors 1977
Captain Fingers - Lee Ritenour 1977
Mahal - Eddie Henderson 1977
René & Angela - René & Angela 1979
Runnin' To Your Love - Eddie Henderson 1979
Total Control (album) - Sound Barrier1983
Chico DeBarge - Chico DeBarge 1986
Skin on Skin - Vanity 1986

External links
 Skip Drinkwater at Discogs

American record producers
Living people
Year of birth missing (living people)